Antennaria racemosa is a species of flowering plant in the family Asteraceae known by the common name racemose pussytoes. It is native to western North America from British Columbia and Alberta south as far as northern California and Wyoming. It grows in mountain forests, generally in moist, partially shaded areas, and often colonizes bare patches of mineral-rich soil, including disturbed areas.

Antennaria racemosa is a glandular perennial herb which may be small, woolly, and matted to nearly hairless and erect to heights near 50 cm (20 inches). It forms basal patches of oval-shaped leaves 3 to 10 centimeters long, fuzzy on the undersides and shiny green above. The patches are connected with stolons covered in leaves. The erect stem bears an inflorescence which can be shaped like a raceme and is often dense, especially in higher elevations, containing several flower heads. The species is dioecious, with male and female plants producing different types of flowers in the heads. The fruit is an achene with a body only about a millimeter long attached to a soft pappus up to 7 millimeters long. The pappus catches the wind, which disperses the seed. The plant also reproduces vegetatively via its creeping stolons.

References

External links

United States Department of Agriculture Plants Profile
Calphotos Photo gallery, University of California
Calflora taxon report, University of California, Antennaria racemosa Hook. raceme pussytoes,  racemose pussytoes 
Turner Photographics, Wildflowers of the Pacific Northwest
Blackfoot Native Plants
Canadian Wildflowers

racemosa
Flora of Western Canada
Flora of the Northwestern United States
Flora of California
Flora of the Cascade Range
Flora of the Klamath Mountains
Plants described in 1834
Taxa named by William Jackson Hooker
Flora without expected TNC conservation status